Euseius multimicropilis is a species of mite in the family Phytoseiidae.

References

multimicropilis
Articles created by Qbugbot
Animals described in 1967